Raphael Rohrer (born 3 May 1985) is a former Liechtenstein footballer.

Coaching career
In the summer 2011, Rohrer was appointed player-head coach of FC Triesen. He was replaced in the summer 2016. He then joined FC Buchs as a player. In February 2018, he took charge of the team as a player-head coach. He left the club in the summer 2019.

International career
He also played for the Liechtenstein national football team, earning 44 caps and one goal to his name, versus Iceland.

International goals
Scores and results list Liechtenstein's goal tally first.

References

External links

1985 births
Living people
Liechtenstein footballers
Liechtenstein international footballers
Association football forwards
FC Vaduz players
USV Eschen/Mauren players
FC Chur 97 players
FC Schaan players
FC Triesen players